The 1925–26 season was the 29th in the history of the Western Football League.

From this season, the league consisted of two divisions after a number of reserve teams joined. The Division One champions were Bristol City Reserves. The winners of Division Two were Poole, who were promoted to Division One.

Division One
Division One consisted of three clubs from the old single-division league, plus two new clubs and five new reserve teams. The number of clubs was thus reduced from thirteen to ten after Peasedown St John left the league.

The seven new teams were:
Bristol City Reserves, rejoining after leaving the league in 1921.
Bristol Rovers Reserves, rejoining after leaving the league in 1921.
Exeter City Reserves, rejoining after leaving the league in 1921.
Plymouth Argyle Reserves
Swindon Town Reserves, rejoining after leaving the league in 1921.
Taunton United
Torquay United, rejoining after leaving the league in 1922.

Division Two
The new Division Two consisted of the other nine clubs from the old single-division league, and four new teams, three of them reserve teams of Division One clubs.

Bath City Reserves
Portland United
Weymouth Reserves
Yeovil and Petters United Reserves

References

1925-26
1925–26 in Welsh football
1925–26 in English football leagues